Metropolitan Anthony (secular name Anton Yuryevich Sevryuk, ; born 12 October 1984), is the primate of the Patriarchal Exarchate in Western Europe of the Russian Orthodox Church. He holds the title of "Metropolitan of Volokolamsk". Chairman of the Department for External Church Relations of the Moscow Patriarchate (since 7 June 2022)

Early life
Sevryuk was baptised at the age of 11. From 1991 to 1995 he studied at Secondary School Number 19 in his home city of Tver. In 1995, he entered the Tver Lyceum.

In his youth, Sevryuk volunteered as an altar server at Holy Resurrection Cathedral in Tver.

Academic studies
In 2002 he entered the St. Petersburg Theological Seminary. During his training he studied, and later was the teacher of an optional English course. He regularly represented the school at various Orthodox conferences and seminars. In 2006, he participated in a workshop of the Syndesmos youth organization in Brussels, Belgium. In 2004-2007 participated annually in the summer Orthodox youth camp in Potamitissa, Cyprus, as a translator and head of the Russian-speaking delegation. In March 2007 he took an internship at the Orthodox religious department at the University of Joensuu, and at the same time worked on parish assignments for the Finnish Orthodox Church. In June 2007, upon returning to Saint Petersburg, he successfully defended his thesis for a seminary course on "Eschatology in World Religions", and on 17 June he graduated from Saint Petersburg Theological Seminary, and in 2010 graduated from the Saint Petersburg Theological Academy. In September 2008, he was appointed teacher of the Smolensk Theological Seminary.

Religious life

Monk 

On 5 March 2009 he was tonsured a monk by then Metropolitan Kirill (Gundyaev) of Smolensk and Kaliningrad, now Patriarch Kirill of Moscow. On 7 October 2015, he was again tonsured by Kirill, this time with the manel with the name of Anthony, after Anthony of Rome.

In Italy 
From 22 March to 30 May 2011, he served as the leading clergyman of the parish of St. Nicholas Stavropegic in Rome, Italy. From 30 May to 12 June 2011 he served as the leading clergyman of the Stavropegial Church in honor of St. Catherine the Great Martyr also in Rome. On 12 June 2011 he was appointed secretary of the parishes of the Moscow Patriarchate in Italy, and elevated to the rank of Archimandrite by Patriarch Kirill.

During his time in Rome, Anthony said that he felt rather lonely as for the first time in his life he was living for a prolonged period of time in a place where Russian Orthodox made a small percentage of the population. Before and during his time in Rome the Orthodox community in Italy had grown to over 50 parishes, mostly due to immigration to Italy from Orthodox populations in Eastern Europe and to a lesser extent by converts. During the same time the Romanian Orthodox community in Italy grew to 163 parishes. Despite feeling uneasy at times, Anthony said that there are many similarities between Italians and Russians in tradition and customs, so the transition to being a pastor in Italy was not hard culturally.

Metropolitan of Chersonesus and Western Europe 
On 30 May 2019, Anthony succeeded John (Roshchin) as the primate of the Patriarchal Exarchate in Western Europe (Moscow Patriarchate), after the Holy Synod of the ROC decided to appoint him and to appoint John (Roshchin) as primate of the Russian Orthodox Diocese of Vienna and Austria. As a result, Anthony became the Metropolitan bishop of the Russian Orthodox Diocese of Chersonesus and Patriarchal exarch in Western Europe, and the locum tenens of the Patriarchal parishes in Italy.

Views on ecumenism
Having spent most of his pastoral career in predominantly Roman Catholic areas, Anthony has stated that it is important for the two churches to have good relations, especially in sites where both Orthodox and Catholic faithful worship. At the Roman Catholic Basilica di San Nicola, a shrine to St. Nicholas the Wonderworker in Bari, he would lead Divine Liturgy on Thursdays. He has thanked the Catholic Church in Italy for its tolerant view of the Orthodox population there, and for occasionally allowing Orthodox to pray in Catholic shrines dedicated to saints that both churches venerate. He did however say it is important that Orthodox worshippers do not pray together with Catholics or attend Mass, as the two churches are not in full communion with one another, and still have theological differences.

References

1984 births
Living people
People from Tver
Bishops of the Russian Orthodox Church
Russian Orthodox Christians from Russia
Eastern Orthodoxy in Austria
Eastern Orthodoxy in Hungary
Eastern Orthodoxy in Italy
21st-century Eastern Orthodox bishops